Bala Kuh or Balakuh in Iran may refer to:
 Bala Kuh, Fars
 Bala Kuh, Zanjan